The St. Marks River is a river in the Big Bend region of Florida. It has been classified by the Florida Department of Environmental Protection as an Outstanding Florida Water, and is the easternmost river within the Northwest Florida Water Management District.

The St. Marks River begins in eastern Leon County, Florida and flows  through Leon and Wakulla counties into Apalachee Bay, an arm of the Gulf of Mexico. It has one significant tributary, the Wakulla River.

A few miles south of its source the St. Marks passes under a natural bridge at Natural Bridge Battlefield Historic State Park and then disappears underground to become a subterranean river for about one-half mile. The river emerges at the St. Marks River Rise, a first magnitude spring with a discharge of 433cf/s, to pass over a stretch of rocks, forming rapids.

The incorporated town of St. Marks is located at the juncture of the Wakulla and St. Marks Rivers. To the north is the community of Newport. Between St. Marks and Newport is a small industrial area serviced by barge.

The San Marcos de Apalache Historic State Park and St. Marks lighthouse are located near the mouth of the river, while the City of Tallahassee's Sam O. Purdom Generating Plant is located on the river in St. Marks.

List of crossings

References

 Marth, Marty. 1990. St. Marks River. in Marth, Del and Marty Marth, eds. The Rivers of Florida. Sarasota, Florida: Pineapple Press, Inc. .
 protectingourwater.org: St. Marks River Watershed
 Emerging Waters: Springs of Northwest Florida
 St. Marks River & Apalachee Bay Watershed
 City Of Tallahassee Sam O. Purdom Generating Station

Bodies of water of Jefferson County, Florida
Bodies of water of Leon County, Florida
Rivers of Florida
Rivers of Wakulla County, Florida
Outstanding Florida Waters
Subterranean rivers of the United States